The 1995 Liga Indonesia Premier Division Final was a football match that took place on 30 July 1995 at Gelora Senayan Main Stadium in Jakarta. It was contested by Petrokimia Putra and Persib to determine the inaugural winner of the Premier Division. Persib won the match 1–0 with the goal scored by Sutiono Lamso in the 76th minute for their first-ever professional title. For winning the title, Persib gained entry to the 1995 Asian Club Championship. Meanwhile, Petrokimia Putra gained entry to the 1995 Asian Cup Winners' Cup as runners-up.

Road to the final

Match details

See also
1994–95 Liga Indonesia Premier Division

References

External links
Liga Indonesia Premier Division standings

1995